McHenry is a home rule-class city in Ohio County, Kentucky, in the United States. The population was 390 at the time of the year 2010 U.S. census.

History
Originally called Hamelton, the town was renamed in 1874 to honor Congressman Henry D. McHenry.

Geography
McHenry is located at  (37.378399, -86.922391). The city is situated along U.S. Route 62 southwest of Beaver Dam and northeast of Central City.

Demographics

As of the census of 2000, there were 417 people, 161 households, and 118 families residing in the city. The racial makeup of the city was 100.00% White.

There were 161 households, out of which 32.3% had children under the age of 18 living with them, 53.4% were married couples living together, 13.7% had a female householder with no husband present, and 26.1% were non-families. 19.9% of all households were made up of individuals, and 6.8% had someone living alone who was 65 years of age or older. The average household size was 2.59 and the average family size was 3.00.

In the city, the population was spread out, with 27.6% under the age of 18, 7.9% from 18 to 24, 30.9% from 25 to 44, 20.4% from 45 to 64, and 13.2% who were 65 years of age or older. The median age was 35 years. For every 100 females, there were 93.1 males. For every 100 females age 18 and over, there were 96.1 males.

The median income for a household in the city was $23,000, and the median income for a family was $28,750. Males had a median income of $28,750 versus $15,104 for females. The per capita income for the city was $12,847. About 20.2% of families and 24.1% of the population were below the poverty line, including 33.0% of those under age 18 and 25.4% of those age 65 or over.

Notable people
Halley G. Maddox, U.S. Army major general

References

External links

Cities in Kentucky
Cities in Ohio County, Kentucky